İscehisar is a town of Afyonkarahisar Province in the Aegean region of Turkey, on the road between the city of Afyon and Ankara. It is the seat of İscehisar District. Its population is 13,285 (2021). The mayor is Ahmet Şahin (AKP).

References

Populated places in Afyonkarahisar Province
Towns in Turkey
İscehisar District